Land Bay is an ice-filled bay, about  wide, indenting the coast of Marie Byrd Land, Antarctica, just eastward of Groves Island. It was discovered by the United States Antarctic Service (1939–41), and takes its name from Land Glacier which descends into the bay.

Further reading
 R. Kwok, Ross Sea Ice Motion, Area Flux, and Deformation, Journal of Climate: Vol. 18, No. 18, pp. 3759–3776. doi: 10.1175/JCLI3507.1

External links 

 Land Bay on USGS website  
 Land Bay on AADC website
  Land Bay on SCAR website
 Land Bay on marineregions

References

Bays of Marie Byrd Land